The scarlet-rumped tanager (Ramphocelus passerinii) is a medium-sized passerine bird. This tanager is a resident breeder in the Caribbean lowlands from southern Mexico to western Panama. This species was formerly known as the scarlet-rumped tanager, but was renamed to Passerini's Tanager after Carlo Passerini, a professor at the Museum of Zoology of the University of Florence, when the distinctive form found on the Pacific coast of Costa Rica and Panama was reclassified as a separate species, the Cherrie's tanager, Ramphocelus costaricensis. While most authorities had accepted this split, there were notable exceptions (e.g. the Howard and Moore checklist). It was renamed back to the scarlet-rumped tanager in 2018 when Cherrie's Tanager was lumped back into the species.

Description

The adult Scarlet-rumped tanager is 16 cm long and weighs 31 g. The adult male is mainly black except for a scarlet rump, silvery bill and dark red iris. The female has a grey head, olive upperparts becoming brighter and paler on the rump, brownish wings and tail and ochre underparts. The female's plumage is the one that differs most from Cherrie's tanager. Immatures have an orange tint to the underparts and rump, and look like a paler and duller female Cherrie's tanager.

The Passerini's tanager's call is a sharp wac. Its song consists of a few clear pleasant notes, delivered in shorter phrases than that of its Pacific relative.

Ecology
It is very common from sea level to 1200 m altitude, and occurs occasionally up to 1700 m. The preferred habitat is semi-open areas including light second growth, woodland edges, gardens and pasture with bushes.

Passerini's tanagers occur in pairs, small groups, or as part of a mixed-species feeding flock, and up to a dozen birds may roost together in dense thickets at night. This species feeds on certain small fruit, usually swallowed whole, insects and spiders.

The cup nest is built up to 6 m high in a tree. The normal clutch is two pale blue or grey eggs, marked with black, brown or lilac. This species will sometimes raise two broods in a season

References

Further reading

 Foster, Mercedes S. (2007): The potential of fruiting trees to enhance converted habitats for migrating birds in southern Mexico. Bird Conservation International 17(1): 45–61.  PDF fulltext
 Stiles, F. Gary & Skutch, Alexander Frank (1989): A guide to the birds of Costa Rica. Comistock, Ithaca. 

Ramphocelus
Birds of Central America
Birds of Belize
Scarlet-rumped tanager
Scarlet-rumped tanager